The Rektoratskirche St. Karl Borromäus, commonly called the , is a Baroque church located on the south side of Karlsplatz in Vienna, Austria. Widely considered the most outstanding baroque church in Vienna, as well as one of the city's greatest buildings, the church is dedicated to Saint Charles Borromeo, one of the great counter-reformers of the sixteenth century.

Located just outside of Innere Stadt in Wieden, approximately 200 meters outside the Ringstraße, the church contains a dome in the form of an elongated ellipsoid.

History 
In 1713, one year after the last great plague epidemic, Charles VI, Holy Roman Emperor, pledged to build a church for his namesake patron saint, Charles Borromeo, who was revered as a healer for plague sufferers. An architectural competition was announced, in which Johann Bernhard Fischer von Erlach prevailed over, among others, Ferdinando Galli-Bibiena and Johann Lukas von Hildebrandt. Construction began in 1716 under the supervision of Anton Erhard Martinelli. After J.B. Fischer's death in 1723, his son, Joseph Emanuel Fischer von Erlach, completed the construction in 1737 using partially altered plans. The church originally possessed a direct line of sight to the Hofburg and was also, until 1918, the imperial patron parish church.

As a creator of historic architecture, the elder Fischer von Erlach united the most diverse of elements. The façade in the center, which leads to the porch, corresponds to a Greek temple portico. The neighboring two columns, crafted by Lorenzo Mattielli, found a model in Trajan's Column in Rome. Next to those, two tower pavilions extend out and show the influence of the Roman baroque (Bernini and Borromini). Above the entrance, a dome rises up above a high drum, which the younger J.E. Fischer shortened and partly altered. 

Next to the Church was the Spitaler Gottesacker. The composer Antonio Vivaldi died in Vienna and was buried there on July 28, 1741 but his tomb has been lost over time. The church hosts regular Vivaldi concerts in his honour. 

Hedwig Kiesler (age 19), later American movie actress and inventor Hedy Lamarr, married Friedrich Mandl (age 32), businessman and Austrofascist, in the tiny chapel of this elaborate church on 10 August 1933. With over 200 prominent guests attending, Kiesler wore “a black-and-white print dress” and carried “a bouquet of white orchids.”

Since Karlsplatz was restored as an ensemble in the late 1980s, the church has garnered fame because of its dome and its two flanking columns of bas-reliefs, as well as its role as an architectural counterweight to the buildings of the Musikverein and of the Vienna University of Technology. The church is cared for by a religious order, the Knights of the Cross with the Red Star,  and has long been the parish church as well as the seat of the Catholic student ministry of the Vienna University of Technology.

Iconography
The iconographical program of the church originated from the imperial official Carl Gustav Heraeus and connects Saint Charles Borromeo with his imperial benefactor. The relief on the pediment above the entrance with the cardinal virtues and the figure of the patron on its apex point to the motivation of the donation. This sculpture group continues onto the attic story as well. The attic is also one of the elements which the younger Fischer introduced. The columns display scenes from the life of Charles Borromeo in a spiral relief and are intended to recall the two columns, Boaz and Jachim, that stood in front of the Temple at Jerusalem.  They also recall the Pillars of Hercules and act as symbols of imperial power. The entrance is flanked by angels from the Old and New Testaments.

This program continues in the interior as well, above all in the dome fresco by Johann Michael Rottmayr of Salzburg and Gaetano Fanti, which displays an intercession of Charles Borromeo, supported by the Virgin Mary. Surrounding this scene are the cardinal virtues. The frescos in a number of side chapels are attributed to Daniel Gran.

The high altarpiece portraying the ascension of the saint was conceptualized by the elder Fischer and executed by Ferdinand Maxmilian Brokoff. The altar paintings in the side chapels are by various artists, including Daniel Gran, Sebastiano Ricci, Martino Altomonte and Jakob van Schuppen. A wooden statue of St. Anthony by Josef Josephu is also on display.

As strong effect emanates from the directing of light and architectural grouping, in particular the arch openings of the main axis. The color scheme is characterized by marble with sparring and conscious use of gold leaf. The large round glass window high above the main altar with the Hebrew Tetragrammaton/Yahweh symbolizes God's omnipotence and simultaneously, through its warm yellow tone, God's love.  Below is a representation of Apotheosis of Saint Charles Borromeo.

Next to the structures at Schönbrunn Palace, which maintain this form but are more fragmented, the church is Fischer's greatest work. It is also an expression of the Austrian joie de vivre stemming from the victorious end of the Turkish Wars.

Pulpit
The pulpit of the church was probably designed by Joseph Emanuel Fischer von Erlach, and his plans might have been executed by a French furniture maker, Claude Le Fort du Plessy in 1735 although there are no surviving documents attesting their authorship or the manufacturing of the church furniture. It is a wooden structure with rich floral, vegetal, rosette and rocaille ornaments, the finer carvings made of hard walnut, in a gold and brown colour scheme. The abat-voix forms a theatrical canopy with two putti holding a cross and a chalice with host; there is a flaming urn on the top. Around 1860 the abat-voix was enlarged. A wide rim was added distorting the original proportions, obscuring the elegant, swirling lines and creating a top-heavy effect. In 2006-2007 this rim was removed after a long debate and the pulpit was restored. The missing carvings of the canopy decorations were reconstructed and the original appearance of the structure was re-established.

Gallery

See also 
 St. Charles Borromeo Cemetery Church
 History of early modern period domes
 List of tallest domes

References
Citations

Bibliography

External links

 
 St Charles at Sacred Destinations
 Great Buildings

 
1737 establishments in Austria
18th-century Roman Catholic church buildings in Austria
Baroque church buildings in Austria
Buildings and structures in Innere Stadt
Church buildings with domes
Roman Catholic churches completed in 1737
Roman Catholic church buildings in the Vicariate of Vienna City